William C. Gruber is an American physician-scientist, pediatrician, and business executive. He is the senior vice president of Pfizer vaccine clinical research and development.

Life 
Gruber completed a bachelor's degree in mathematical sciences at Rice University. He earned a M.D. at Baylor College of Medicine where he completed a residency in pediatric and infectious disease. His college roommate was immunologist Barney S. Graham.

Gruber was an associate professor of pediatrics at the Vanderbilt University School of Medicine. He served worked as the director of the diagnostic virology laboratory at Vanderbilt University Medical Center. Gruber joined Wyeth in 1999 as the vice president of clinical vaccine research. He is the senior vice president of Pfizer vaccine clinical research and development. He oversees the global clinical development of vaccines.

Gruber is a fellow of the American Academy of Pediatrics and the Infectious Diseases Society of America.

References

External links
 

Living people
Year of birth missing (living people)
Place of birth missing (living people)
Rice University alumni
Baylor College of Medicine alumni
Vanderbilt University faculty
Pfizer people
21st-century American physicians
21st-century American biologists
Physician-scientists
American medical researchers
Fellows of the Infectious Diseases Society of America
21st-century American businesspeople
American business executives